This is a list of township-level divisions of the municipality of Tianjin, People's Republic of China (PRC). After province, prefecture, and county-level divisions, township-level divisions constitute the formal fourth-level administrative divisions of the PRC. However, as Tianjin is a province-level municipality, the prefecture-level divisions are absent and so county-level divisions are at the second level, and township-level divisions are at the third level of administration. There are a total of 244 such divisions in Tianjin, divided into 106 subdistricts, 118 towns, 19 townships and 1 ethnic township. This list is organised by the county-level divisions of the municipality.

Baodi District

Subdistricts:
Baoping Subdistrict (宝平街道), Haibin Subdistrict (海滨街道), Yuhua Subdistrict (钰华街道)

Towns:
Majiadian (马家店镇), Dakoutun (大口屯镇), Xinkaikou (新开口镇), Dabaizhuang (大白庄镇), Haogezhuang (郝各庄镇), Niudaokou (牛道口镇), Xin'an (新安镇), Dazhongzhuang (大钟庄镇), Wangbozhuang (王卜庄镇), Fangjiazhuang (方家庄镇), Bamencheng (八门城镇), Gaojiazhuang (高家庄镇), Zhangezhuang (霍各庄镇), Koudong (口东镇), Lintingkou (林亭口镇), Zhouliangzhuang (周良庄镇), Datangzhuang (大唐庄镇), Shigezhuang (史各庄镇), Huangzhuang (黄庄真), Erwangzhuang (尔王庄镇), Niujiapai (牛家牌镇)

Beichen District

Subdistricts:
Guoyuanxincun Subdistrict (果园新村街道), Jixianli Subdistrict (集贤里街道), Pudong Subdistrict (普东街道), Jiarongli Subdistrict (佳荣里街道)

Towns:
Beicang (北仓镇), Tianmu (天穆镇), Shuangjie (双街镇), Shuangkou (双口镇), Qingguang (青光镇), Xiaodian (小淀镇), Yixingbu (宜兴埠镇), Xititou (西堤头镇), Dazhangzhuang (大张庄镇)

Binhai New Area

Subdistricts:
Xingang Subdistrict (新港街道), Xincun Subdistrict (新村街道), Xiangyang Subdistrict (向阳街道), Bohaishiyou Subdistrict (渤海石油街道), Xinhe Subdistrict (新河街道), Dagu Subdistrict (大沽街道), Beitang Subdistrict (北塘街道), Hangzhou Street Subdistrict (杭州道街道), Hujiayuan Subdistrict (胡家园街道), Hangu Subdistrict (汉沽街道), Zhaishang Subdistrict (寨上街道), Hexi Subdistrict (河西街道), Yingbin Subdistrict (迎宾街道), Shengli Subdistrict (胜利街道), Gulin Subdistrict (古林街道), Haibin Subdistrict (海滨街道), Gangxi Subdistrict (港西街道), Xinbei Subdistrict (新北街道), Yujiabao Subdistrict (于家堡街道)

Towns:
Xincheng (新城镇), Chadian (茶淀镇), Datian (大田镇), Yangjiabo (杨家泊镇), Taiping (太平镇), Xiaowangzhuang (小王庄镇), Zhongtang (中塘镇)

Dongli District

Subdistricts:
Zhangguizhuang Subdistrict (张贵庄街道), Fengniancun Subdistrict (丰年村街道), Jinqiao Subdistrict (金桥街道), Wuxia Subdistrict (无瑕街道), Xinli Subdistrict (新立街道), Wanxin Subdistrict (万新街道), Junliangcheng Subdistrict (军粮城街道), Huaming Subdistrict (华明街道), Jinzhong Subdistrict (金钟街道)

Hebei District

Subdistricts:
Wanghailou Subdistrict (望海楼街道), Guangfu Street Subdistrict (光复道街道), Hongshunli Subdistrict (鸿顺里街道), Xinkaihe Subdistrict (新开河街道), Tiedong Road Subdistrict (铁东路街道 ), Ningyuan Subdistrict (宁园街道), Jianchang Street Subdistrict (建昌道街道), Wangchuanchang Subdistrict (王串场街道), Jiangdu Road Subdistrict (江都路街道), Yueyahe Subdistrict (月牙河街道)

Hedong District

Subdistricts:
Dawangzhuang Subdistrict (大王庄街道), Dazhigu Subdistrict (大直沽街道), Zhongshanmen Subdistrict (中山门街道), Fumin Road Subdistrict (富民路街道), Erhaoqiao Subdistrict (二号桥街道), Chunhua Subdistrict (春华街道), Tangjiakou Subdistrict (唐家口街道), Xiangyanglou Subdistrict (向阳楼街道), Changzhou Street Subdistrict (常州道街道), Shanghang Road Subdistrict (上杭路街道), Lushan Street Subdistrict (鲁山道街道), Dongxin Subdistrict (东新街道), Tiechang Subdistrict (铁厂街道)

Heping District

Subdistricts:
Xiaobailou Subdistrict (小白楼街道), Quanyechang Subdistrict (劝业场街道), Tiyuguan Subdistrict (体育馆街道), Xinxing Subdistrict, Tianjin Subdistrict (新兴街道), Nanyingmenshequ Subdistrict (南营门社区街道), Nanshi Subdistrict (南市街道)

Hexi District

Subdistricts:
Dayingmen Subdistrict (大营门街道), Donghai Subdistrict (东海街道), Taoyuan Subdistrict (桃园街道), Guajiasi Subdistrict (挂甲寺街道), Machang Subdistrict (马场街道), Yuexiu Road Subdistrict (越秀路街道), Youyi Road Subdistrict (友谊路街道), Tianta Subdistrict (天塔街道), Jianshan Subdistrict (尖山街道), Chentangzhuang Subdistrict (陈塘庄街道), Liulin Subdistrict (柳林街道), Xiawafang Subdistrict (下瓦房街道), Meijiang Subdistrict (梅江街道)

Hongqiao District

Subdistricts:
Xiyuzhuang Subdistrict (西于庄街道), Dingzigu Subdistrict (丁字沽街道), Lingchengge Subdistrict (铃铛阁街道), Santiaoshi Subdistrict (三条石街道), North Xianyang Road Subdistrict (咸阳北路街道), Xigu Subdistrict (西沽街道), Jieyuan Subdistrict (芥园街道), Shaogongzhuang Subdistrict (邵公庄街道), Dahutong Subdistrict (大胡同街道), Shuanghuancun Subdistrict (双环村街道)

Jinnan District

Towns:
Xianshuigu (咸水沽镇), Beizhakou (北闸口镇), Xinzhuang (辛庄镇), Balitai (八里台镇), Shuanggang (双港镇), Xiaozhan (小站镇), Gegu (葛沽镇), Shuangqiaohe (双桥河镇)

Nankai District

Subdistricts:
Changhong Subdistrict (长虹街道), Gulou Subdistrict (鼓楼街道), Guangkai Subdistrict (广开街道), Jialing Street Subdistrict (嘉陵道街道), Wangdingti Subdistrict (王顶堤街道), Xiangyang Road Subdistrict (向阳路街道), Wanxing Subdistrict (万兴街道), Xuefu Subdistrict (学府街道), Xingnan Subdistrict (兴南街道), Huayuan Subdistrict (华苑街道), Tiyuzhongxin Subdistrict (体育中心街道), Shuishang Park Subdistrict (水上公园街道)

Wuqing District

Subdistricts:
West Grand Canal Subdistrict (运河西街道), Yangcun Subdistrict (杨村街道), Xuguantun Subdistrict (徐官屯街道), Xiazhuzhuang Subdistrict (下朱庄街道), Huangzhuang Subdistrict (黄庄街道), Dongpuwa Subdistrict (东蒲洼街道)

Towns:
Dongmaquan (东马圈镇), Huanghuadian (黄花淀镇), Shigezhuang (石各庄镇), Tianqingtuo (王庆坨镇), Shuanggugang (汊沽港镇), Chenzui (陈嘴镇), Meichang (梅厂镇), Shangmatai (上马台镇), Cuihuangkou (崔黄口镇), Hebeitun (河北屯镇), Xiawuqi (下伍旗镇), Dajianchang (大碱厂镇), Daliang (大良镇), Chengguan (城关镇), Damengzhuang (大孟庄镇), Sicundian (泗村店镇), Hexiwu (河西务镇), Nancaicun (南蔡村镇), Dawangguzhuang (大王古庄镇), Gaocun

Townships:
Douzhangzhuang Township (豆张庄乡), Dahuangbao Township (大黄堡乡), Caozili Township (曹子里乡), Baigutun Township (白古屯乡)

Xiqing District

Subdistricts:
Liqizhuang Subdistrict (李七庄街道), Xiyingmen Subdistrict (西营门街道)

Towns:
Yangliuqing (杨柳青镇), Jingwu (精武镇), Zhangjiawo (张家窝镇), Wangwenzhuang (王稳庄镇), Zhongbei (中北镇), Xinkou (辛口镇), Dasi (大寺镇)

Jinghai District

Towns:
Jinghai Town (静海镇), Duliu (独流镇), Taitou (台头镇), Wangkou (王口镇), Liangtou (梁头镇), Xizhaizhuang (西翟庄镇), Dafengdui (大丰堆镇), Tangguantun (唐官屯镇), Zhongwang (中旺镇), Shuangtang (双塘镇), Yanzhuang (沿庄镇), Ziya (子牙镇), Tuanbo (团泊镇), Daqiuzhuang (大邱庄镇), Caigongzhuang (蔡公庄镇), Chenguantun (陈官屯镇)

Townships:
Liangwangzhuang Township (良王庄乡), Yangchengzhuang Township (杨成庄乡)

Ninghe District

Towns:
Lutai (芦台镇), Fengtai (丰台镇), Yuelong (岳龙镇), Ninghe Town (宁河镇), Miaozhuang (苗庄镇), Qilihai (七里海镇), Dongjituo (东棘坨镇), Zaojiacheng (造甲城镇), Panzhuang (潘庄镇), Banqiao (板桥镇), Dabeijiangu (大北涧沽镇)

Townships:
Lianzhuang Township (廉庄乡), Biaokou Township (俵口乡), Beihuaidian Township (北淮淀乡)

Ji County

The only subdistrict is Wenchang Subdistrict (文昌街道)

Towns:
Yuyang (渔阳镇), Xiaying (下营镇), Xiacang (下仓镇), Sangzi (桑梓镇), Chutouling (出头岭镇), Luozhuangzi (罗庄子镇), Wubaihu (五百户镇), Xiawotou (下窝头镇), Baijian (白涧镇), Bangjun (邦均镇), Yinliu (洇溜镇), Bieshan (别山镇), Mashenqiao (马伸桥镇), Longguzhuang (尤古庄镇), Houjiaying (侯家营镇), Yangjinzhuang (杨津庄镇), Shangcang (上仓镇), Guanzhuang (官庄镇), Shigu (施古镇), Xilonghuyu (西龙虎峪镇)

Townships:
Chuanfangyu Township (穿芳峪乡), Xujiatai Township (许家台乡), Limingzhuang Township (礼明庄乡), Dongzhaogezhuang Township (东赵各庄乡), Dong'erying Township (东二营乡), Sungezhuang Manchu Ethnic Township (孙各庄满族乡)

References

External links

 
Tianjin
 Townships

zh:天津市乡级以上行政区列表